Araghju is an archaeological site in Corsica. It is located in the commune of San-Gavino-di-Carbini.

Archaeological sites in Corsica